The Medal for Gallantry is the highest military award of Greece. It was instituted in 1974, but has neither been struck nor awarded yet.

This medal may be awarded for proven heroic acts on the battlefield, in the performance of ordered military action in which life was in obvious and immediate danger, or an act which greatly exceeds the performance of duty and draws the admiration and appreciation of superiors, subordinates or the public.

References

Medal for Gallantry (Greece)
Courage awards
1974 establishments in Greece
Awards established in 1974